The Song of Roland is a 1978 French drama film directed by Frank Cassenti and starring Klaus Kinski.

Cast
 Klaus Kinski as Roland / Klaus
 Alain Cuny as Turpin / Le moine
 Dominique Sanda as Anna
 Pierre Clémenti as Olivier / Le clerc
 Jean-Pierre Kalfon as Marsile / Turold / Charlemagne
 Monique Mercure as Marie
 Niels Arestrup as The merchant / Oton
 Serge Merlin as Pair Marsile / Ganelon / Thierry
 László Szabó as Duc Naimes / Chevalier hongrois
 Bruno Moynot as Pair Charlemagne / A pilgrim / A monk
 Mario Gonzáles as Blancandrin / Jeannot, le voleur
 Yvan Labejoff as Turgis / L'esclave noir (as Yvan Labejof)
 Isabelle Mercanton as Femme commerçant
 Dominique Valentin as La fille du seigneur
 Marilu Marini as La femme du seigneur
 Jean-Claude Brialy as Le Seigneur

References

External links

1978 films
1970s biographical drama films
1970s French-language films
Works based on The Song of Roland
Films set in the 8th century
Films set in France
French biographical drama films
Films based on the Matter of France
Films based on poems
Cultural depictions of Charlemagne
1978 drama films
1970s French films